Kerttu Maarit Kirsti Vuolab (May 1, 1951 Utsjoki, Finland) is a Finnish Sámi author, illustrator, translator and songwriter, who has made it her life mission to ensure that the Sámi oral tradition, language and culture are passed on to future generations of Sámi  through multiple media types. Her works have been translated into other Sámi languages such as Inari and Skolt Sámi as well as non-Sámi languages such as Swedish, Finnish, and English.

Biography

Early life
Kerttu Vuolab was born on May 1, 1951 in the village of Outakoski to Nils Ola Vuolab and Kristiina Kitti. She grew up on the Finnish side of the border in the Teno River Valley where she still lives today.

Awards
In 1983, Vuolab won an award from the Sami Writers' Association (SGS) recognizing her contribution to children's literature in Sámi. The same year, she won another award for the same reason from the Finnish Reading Association (FinRa). From January 1, 1994 to December 31, 1998, Vuolab served as artist laureate of the Province of Lapland. On December 6, 2006, Vuolab was awarded the First Class Knight of the White Rose of Finland. In 2011, she was nominated for the Nordic Council Literature Prize for her novel Bárbmoáirras. In 2014, Vuolab won the pan-Nordic Sami language award Gollegiella along with Mikael Svonni and Seija Sivertsen in recognition and appreciation of her contributions to Northern Sámi literature.

Bibliography

Books, pamphlets and articles 
 Golbma skihpáračča (1979, republished in 1989, with translations into Inari Sámi and Skolt Sámi also in 1989)
 Ánde ja Risten jagi fárus (1990)
 Sámegiella, skuvlagiella. Saamenkieli, koulukieli (1990)
 Snellman. Puhu omaa kieltäsi lapsellesi/ Hála mánnásat iezat eatnigiela (1993)
 Čeppári čáráhus (1994: a novel for young adults)
 Čomisteaddjit (2005: written together with Sverre Porsanger)
 Sámi – Saamelaiset – Les sames (2007)
 Bárbmoáirras (2008)

Audiobooks and sound recordings
 Ánde ja Risten jagi fárus (1990)
 Bárbmoáirras (2009)

Anthologies  
 Cafe Boddu 2: Essayčoakkáldat (1995)
 Kukapa se sinäkin olet?/ Giibat don leat? Artikkelikokoelma (2000)
 Juoga mii geasuha. Sámi Girječálliid searvvi antologiija (2001)
 Whispering Treasures: an anthology (2012)

Translations

Books
 Antoine de Saint-Exupéry: Bás prinssaš (1981) (The Little Prince)
 Tove Jansson: Mo son de geavvá? (2000) (The Book about Moomin, Mymble and Little My)
 Iraida Vinogradova: Buhtes gáldut : diktacoakkáldat = Чӣллк Кāйв: Ēнн ōллма гуйкэ стиха кнӣга (2003), translated  together with Leif Rantala

Videos
 Selma Lagerlöf: Lottežan Niillasa mátkkit 1-2 : Ruoktoháldi : Luođu čuotnjágat (1999) (The Wonderful Adventures of Nils)
 Selma Lagerlöf: Lottežan Niillasa mátkkit 3-4 : Smirre-rieban : Oarri čivggat (1999) (The Wonderful Adventures of Nils)
 Selma Lagerlöf: Lottežan Niillasa mátkkit 5-6 : Vittskövle ladni : Luođu čuotnjágiid gilvvut (1999) (The Wonderful Adventures of Nils)
 Tove Jansson: Mo son de geavvá? (1993)

Discography
Vuolab has written the words for the following songs for Mari Boine:
 Eadnán bákti (To Woman, lit. the Rock of My Mother) on Gula gula (1989)
 Skádja (The Reverberation) on Goaskinviellja (1993)  and on Eallin (1996) 

 Ipmiliin hálešteapmi (Conversation With God) on Čuovgga Áirras (2009)
 Čuovgga Áirras - Sterna Paradisea on Čuovgga Áirras (2009)

Translations 
Vuolab has also translated the following song's words for Eero Magga:
 Idjastállu (together with Siiri Miettinen. Translation of Tapio Rautavaara’s Sininen Uni)

References

Sources

External links
 Kerttu Vuolab 
 Kerttu Vuolab (in Norwegian)
 Vuolab, Kerttu (1951 - ) (in Finnish)

1951 births
Living people
People from Utsjoki
Writers from Lapland (Finland)
Finnish Sámi people
Finnish writers
Finnish Sámi-language writers
Finnish women writers